, better known by the stage name , was a Japanese voice actor born in Osaka, Japan. Kitamura was employed by the talent management agency Mausu Promotion. He is known for dubbing roles played by Peter Cushing. He died on October 2, 2007 of pneumonia.

Anime

TV
1968
Animal 1 (Shirou Azuma)
Sabu to Ichi Torimono Hikae (Saheiji)

1969
Moomin (Herumu)

1970
Ashita no Joe (Hyodo)

1971
Andersen Stories (Carl's Father)
Tensai Bakabon (Koichi Kitamura)
Marvelous Melmo (Waregarasu)

1972
Onbu Obake (Miyasu)

1973
Karate Baka Ichidai (Kato)
Kerokko Demetan (Ametaro)
Casshan (Dr. Kozuki)
Fables of the Green Forest (Rocky's Father)
Wansa-kun (Kouta's Father)

1974
Chiisana Viking Vicke (Grampa Ulobe)

1975
Time Bokan (Da Vinci)

1977
Yatterman (Helmet)

1978
Takarajima (Redroose)
Lupin III: Part II (Chen Dongnan, Conan Drill, Hong Xiuquan, Jio Makurido, King, Monsieur Dalí, Musshu Dare/Inspector Magure, Nanja, Sharlock, Sherlock, Shuuzen Kou)

1979
Toshi Gordian (Saxinder)
The Rose of Versailles (Jeweler)

1980
Ojamanga Yamada-kun (Gotou, Sori)

1981
Urusei Yatsura (Shuutarou's Grandfather)

1982
Space Adventure Cobra (Carbine)
The Mysterious Cities of Gold (Kuraka)

1983
The Super Dimension Century Orguss (Gove, Gorb)
Manga Nihon-shi (Toyotomi Hideyoshi)

1984
Lupin III: Part III (Yunkeru, Spawlding)

1985
Touch (Coach Nishio)
Highschool! Kimengumi (Gorō Mutsu)

1987
City Hunter (Informer, Kouzou)
Fist of the North Star 2 (Petero)

1988
Little Lord Fauntleroy (Jefferson)
Tatakae!! Ramenman (Shinjuku no Chichi)
Hai Akko Desu (Taiichi)

1989
Ranma 1/2 (Sakuramochi Salseman, Ultra)

1990
Like the Clouds, Like the Wind (Mano)
RPG Densetsu Hepoi (Paru Grandpa)

1991
Lupin the 3rd: Napoleon's Dictionary (Old Scientist)

1992
Hime-chan's Ribbon (King)
YuYu Hakusho (Youda)
Lupin the 3rd: From Siberia with Love (Bucchu)

1994
Samurai Shodown: The Motion Picture (Shiranui Gen'an)
Mahoujin Guru Guru (Feifei)

1995 
Soar High! Isami (Isami's Grandfather)
Ninku (Gauni)
Bit the Cupid (Bacchus)

1996
Virtua Fighter (Shun Di)
Kochira Katsushika-ku Kamearikouen-mae Hashutsujo (Kanbei Ryotsu, Taro Urashima)
Dragon Ball GT (Eskar)
Mojacko (Mujanka)
Rurouni Kenshin (Jūsanrō Tani, Nenji Kashiwazaki)

1997
Pokémon (Ryu)

1998
Prince Mackaroo (Owner)
Super Doll Licca-chan (Oldman)
Outlaw Star (Hadul)
The Mysterious Cities of Gold (Papamakayo)

1999
Gozonji! Gekkō Kamen-kun (First Gekkou-Kamen)
Trouble Chocolate (Lake Annecy NG)

2000
Sakura Wars (Aritsune Hanakouji)
Hidamari no Ki (Genshou Ikawa)

2001
Touch: Cross Road - Kaze no Yukue (Simon)
Digimon Tamers (Chou's Sensei)
Hajime no Ippo (Chairman Naniwa)

2002
Patapata Hikōusen no Bōuken (Gordon)
Pecola (Policeman Kuada, Professor Kamikutta)
Ghost in the Shell: Stand Alone Complex (Old Man)

2003
Gad Guard (Gary)
Mermaid Forest (Natsume's Father)
Last Exile (Anatoray Emperor)

2004
Zatch Bell (Jii)
Saiyuki Gunlock (Goku's Touken)
Monster (General Helmut Wolfe)

2005
Gallery Fake (Elder)
Shinshaku Sengoku Eiyū Densetsu - Sanada Jū Yūshi The Animation (Sado-no-kami Masanobu Honda)

2006
One Piece (Professor Clover)

2007
Kaiketsu Zorori (Okappa)

OVA
Armored Trooper Votoms: Big Battle (Cherokee)
The Heroic Legend of Arslan (Jon Bodan)
Key the Metal Idol (Dr. Murao Mima)
Macross Plus (General Gomez)

Movies
Akira (Miyako, Committee Member A)
Little Nemo: Adventures in Slumberland (Professor Genius)
Doraemon: Nobita and the Birth of Japan (Elder)
Doraemon: Nobita and the Knights on Dinosaurs (Section Chief)
Doraemon: Nobita's Galactic Express (Ninja Master)
Doraemon: The Record of Nobita: Spaceblazer (Mesu)
The Heroic Legend of Arslan (Jon Bodan)
Sakura Wars series (Count Aritsune Hanakoji)
Touch series (Coach Nishio)
Urusei Yatsura: The Final Chapter (Upa)
Ultra Nyan: Hoshizora Kara Maiorita Fushigi Neko (1997) (Doctor)
Ultra Nyan 2: Happy Daisakusen (movie) (1998) (Doctor)

GamesSakura Wars 2: Thou Shalt Not Die (1998) (Teruho Hanakoji)Brave Fencer Musashi (Yukkeru Jii)Lunar: The Silver Star (Faidy (Quark) the White Dragon)Sakura Wars series (Count Aritsune Hanakoji)Tenchu series (Naotada Sekiya)Tokimeki Memorial Girl's Side (Garçon Ito)

Dubbing
Live-actionAlien (1981 Laserdisc edition) (Brett (Harry Dean Stanton))Batman (Alfred)A Better Tomorrow III: Love & Death in Saigon (Michael's Father (Shih Kien))Buffalo Bill and the Indians, or Sitting Bull's History Lesson (1981 TV Asahi edition) (Nate Salisbury (Joel Grey))Django (Brother Jonathan)Dragon Lord (The Big Boss (Hwang In-shik))Indiana Jones and the Last Crusade (The Grail Knight (Robert Eddison))James Bond seriesGoldfinger (1978 NTV edition) (Colonel Smithers (Richard Vernon))Moonraker (General Gogol)A View to a Kill (Q)Licence to Kill (Q)Tomorrow Never Dies (Q)The World Is Not Enough (2003 TV Asahi edition) (Q)Kramer vs. Kramer (Spencer (Jack Ramage))Roman Holiday (The Ambassador of Princess Ann's country)The Score (Danny (Paul Soles))She-Wolf of London (Reverend Goodbody (Adrian Cairns))Stuck on You (Morty O'Reilly (Seymour Cassel))Tower of Death (Billy's Father)

AnimationAnimaniacs (Dr. Otto Scratchansniff)DuckTales (Scrooge McDuck)DuckTales the Movie: Treasure of the Lost Lamp (Scrooge McDuck)Felix the Cat (Professor)Muppets Tonight (Waldorf, Dr. Phil Van Neuter)Ned's Newt (Shopkeeper)The Simpsons (Mr. Burns)The Rescuers The Aristocats (Georges Hautecourt)Snow White and the Seven Dwarfs (Sleepy)

Live actionMoonlight Mask'' (Policeman, others)

References

External links
 Mausu Promotion

 Seiyū Database
 Japan Movie Database

1931 births
Japanese male video game actors
Japanese male voice actors
2007 deaths
Male voice actors from Osaka Prefecture
Tokyo Actor's Consumer's Cooperative Society voice actors
Mausu Promotion voice actors